Wyreka is an unincorporated community in Putnam County, in the U.S. state of Missouri.

Wyreka was platted in 1858.  The name most likely is a phonetic transfer from Yreka, California.

References

Unincorporated communities in Putnam County, Missouri
Unincorporated communities in Missouri